Zus & Zo is a 2001 Dutch film directed by Paula van der Oest. It was nominated for the Academy Award for Best Foreign Language Film.

Plot
The film deals with three sisters stopping their gay brother's new bride from inheriting the family hotel. They use various comedic methods to stop the wedding.

Cast
 Monic Hendrickx - Sonja
 Anneke Blok - Wanda
  - Michelle
 Jacob Derwig - Nino
 Halina Reijn - Bo
  - Hugo
  - Jan
 Annet Nieuwenhuyzen - Moeder
  - Felix Delicious
  - Dorien

Reception
Zus & Zo has an approval rating of 42% on review aggregator website Rotten Tomatoes, based on 19 reviews, and an average rating of 4.93/10. Metacritic assigned the film a weighted average score of 50 out of 100, based on 9 critics, indicating "mixed or average reviews".

A. O. Scott of The New York Times in 2003, said the acting, especially by the actresses playing the three sisters, "was unassuming and precise". But the film suffers from being "inadvertently, a little misogynistic". 
"a complicated confection" and "Convoluted plot aside, universally understandable", said Eddie Cockrell of Variety.

References

External links

2000s Dutch-language films
2001 films
2000s fantasy comedy films
2001 romantic comedy films
2001 LGBT-related films
2000s romantic fantasy films
Dutch romantic comedy films